The EG Awards of 2010 are the fifth Annual The Age EG (Entertainment Guide) Awards and took place at the Prince of Wales on 15 December 2010. The event was hosted by Brian Nankervis.

Hall of Fame inductees
Paul Kelly

Life Time Achievement Awards
Patrick Donovan

Performers
Dan Kelly
Eagle and the Worm
Lemonheads
Megan Washington
Paul Kelly
Tim Rogers
The Drones

Award nominees and winners
Winners indicated below in boldface

References

2010 in Australian music
2010 music awards
Music Victoria Awards